Marija Obradović (born 6 August 1992) is a Serbian female handball player for HH Elite and the Serbia national team.

She was part of the team at the 2016 European Women's Handball Championship.

References

External links

1992 births
Living people
Serbian female handball players
Handball players from Belgrade
Expatriate handball players
Serbian expatriate sportspeople in Germany
Serbian expatriate sportspeople in Slovenia
Mediterranean Games competitors for Serbia
Competitors at the 2018 Mediterranean Games
21st-century Serbian women